The 1979–80 Buffalo Sabres season was the Sabres' tenth season of operation for the National Hockey League franchise that was established on May 22, 1970. The team was awarded the Prince of Wales Trophy for finishing with the best regular season record in the Prince of Wales Conference.

Offseason

NHL Draft

Regular season

Season standings

Schedule and results

Player statistics

Forwards
Note: GP = Games played; G=  Goals; A = Assists; Pts = Points; PIM = Penalty minutes

Defencemen
Note: GP = Games played; G = Goals; A = Assists; Pts = Points; PIM = Penalty minutes

Goaltending
Note: GP = Games played; W = Wins; L = Losses; T = Ties; SO = Shutouts; GAA = Goals against average

Playoffs
 First Round
 No. 2 seed Buffalo over No. 15 seed Vancouver (3 games to 1)
 Second Round
 No. 2 seed Buffalo over No. 7 seed Chicago (4 games to 0)
 Third Round
 No. 5 seed New York Islanders over No. 2 seed Buffalo  (4 games to 2)

Awards and records
 Prince of Wales Trophy
 NHL Plus/Minus Award Jim Schoenfeld
 Bob Sauve and Don Edwards, Vezina Trophy
 Danny Gare, NHL Goals Leader
 Don Edwards, Goaltender, NHL Second Team All-Star
 Danny Gare, Right Wing, NHL Second Team All-Star
 Jim Schoenfeld, Defenceman, NHL Second Team All-Star
 Bob Sauve, posted league's lowest goals against average.

References
 Sabres on Hockey Database

Buffalo Sabres seasons
Buffalo
Buffalo
Adams Division champion seasons
Eastern Conference (NHL) championship seasons
1979 in sports in New York (state)
Buffalo